Cletus Handley Francis Turner (23 April 1909 – 23 April 1961) was an Australian rules footballer who played with Carlton, Fitzroy and Geelong in the Victorian Football League (VFL).

Notes

External links 
Clete Turner's profile at Blueseum

1909 births
1961 deaths
Carlton Football Club players
Fitzroy Football Club players
Geelong Football Club players
Australian rules footballers from Victoria (Australia)
People from Colac, Victoria